The  Blackwater Estuary is the estuary of the River Blackwater between Maldon and West Mersea in Essex. It is a 5,538 hectare biological Site of Special Scientific Interest (SSSI). An area of 4,395 hectares is also designated a Ramsar Wetland of International Importance, and a Special Protection Area 1,099 hectares is a National Nature Reserve. Tollesbury Wick and part of Abbotts Hall Farm, both nature reserve managed by the Essex Wildlife Trust, are in the SSSI.

Oysters have been harvested from the estuary for more than a thousand years and there are remains of fish weirs from the Anglo-Saxon era. At the head of the estuary is the town of Maldon, which is a centre of salt production. The other major settlement is the town West Mersea, of Mersea Island, on the northern seaward side. Numerous other villages are on its banks.

Within the estuary is Northey Island which was the location for the first experiments in the UK in 'managed retreat', i.e. creating saltmarsh by setting sea walls back from what are perceived to be unsustainable positions. The area is notable as a breeding area for little tern (Sternula albifrons) and as a transit point for ringed plover (Charadrius hiaticula).

Over-wintering species
Pied avocet (Recurvirostra avosetta)
Black-tailed godwit (Limosa limosa islandica)
Dark-bellied brent goose (Branta bernicla bernicla)
Dunlin (Calidris alpina alpina)
Eurasian golden plover (Pluvialis apricaria)
Grey plover (Pluvialis squatarola)
Hen harrier (Circus cyaneus)
Common redshank (Tringa totanus)
Ringed plover (Charadrius hiaticula)
Ruff (Philomachus pugnax)
Common shelduck (Tadorna tadorna)

The estuary is also the current mooring location for the radio ship Ross Revenge, the home of former pirate station Radio Caroline

See also 
Osea Island
Pewet Island

References

External links 
Its management and conservation project

Estuaries of England
Special Protection Areas in England
Sites of Special Scientific Interest in Essex
Sites of Special Scientific Interest notified in 1955
Nature Conservation Review sites
Economy of Essex
Ramsar sites in England
Managed retreat
Coastal Essex